The women's 200 metres at the 2015 World Championships in Athletics is scheduled to be held at the Beijing National Stadium on 26, 27 and 28 August.

Summary
Shelly-Ann Fraser-Pryce of Jamaica entered the competition as defending champion but after winning the 100 metres, decided against running here.  Reigning Olympic champion, Allyson Felix won a bye to compete by virtue of winning the 2014 IAAF Diamond League, but passed in order to focus on the 400 metres which would hold its final less than an hour before the semi-final round.  2013 silver medalist Murielle Ahouré did not return, and 2013 bronze medalist Blessing Okagbare did not start in the heats.

In the finals, two time Olympic Champion and 2011 World Champion Veronica Campbell-Brown relegated to lane 2 after finishing 7th in the semis, was the leader out of the blocks with Dina Asher-Smith and Jeneba Tarmoh also getting good starts. Elaine Thompson was last out of the blocks but rocketed around the turn to be the second to hit the straightaway behind "VCB." Candyce McGrone was about even with Asher-Smith and Dafne Schippers behind them with less than 90 metres to the finish.  Thompson continued her speed to the front as Schippers let out her long strides to eat up territory.  McGrone and Campbell-Brown were in the battle for bronze, Schippers looking too far back to catch Thompson but gaining with every stride.  And Schippers caught her with 5 metres to spare, continuing on to the win.  Campbell-Brown held off McGrone for bronze.	

Schippers time of 21.63 made her the #3 performer of all time, Thompson at 21.66 became #5.  Neither of them had been on the list prior to this race.  It was a .40 improvement of her personal best for Schippers and a .44 improvement for Thompson.  Schippers took down Marita Koch's 36-year-old, drug tainted European record and broke the 28 year old Championship Record held by East Germany's Silke Gladisch Moeller.  Both runners were faster than Allyson Felix or Shelly-Ann Fraser-Pryce have ever run. Dina Asher-Smith's 22.07 in fifth place became the new British record and the fastest performance by a teenager, though cannot surpass Felix's junior world record because Asher Smith would turn 20 before the end of the calendar year.

Records
Prior to the competition, the records were as follows:

Qualification standards

Schedule

Results

Heats
Qualification: Best 3 (Q) and next 3 fastest (q) qualify for the next round.

Semifinals
Qualification: First 2 in each heat (Q) and the next 2 fastest (q) advanced to the final.

Final
The final was held at 21:00.

References

200
200 metres at the World Athletics Championships
2015 in women's athletics